Egyptian vehicle registration number plates are used for official identification purposes for motor vehicles in Egypt. The international vehicle registration code for Egypt is ET.

Appearance 

The current vehicle registration plates, which have been used since August 2020, are rectangular in shape and made of aluminum. 
The top part has the word "Egypt" in English and Arabic in black font on backgrounds of different colors depending on the type of license the vehicle is given. Motorbikes have similar but much smaller plates with light blue (private motorbikes) and dark blue (police motorbikes) the only colors available.

The vehicle registration number consists of two parts:

Numeric part: 3 numbers for Cairo license plates, 4 for the rest of the governorates (including Giza.)
Alphabetical part: 2 letters for Giza license plates, 3 letters the rest of the governorates (including Cairo.)

Numbers go from 1 to 9 and are chosen randomly. x is a random letter.

Note : These plate codes do not apply for army, police and diplomatic vehicles. 

Use of Latin letters and Western Arabic numerals was abandoned early due to the unease of reading the Arabic letters and numbers because they were too small. 

To reduce the risk of confusion on account of the visual similarity between Arabic letters, only a limited number of letters are used. They and the Latin letters the Egyptian government uses to correspond to them are:

Size 
Standard license plates are of 17x35 cm.

Design and format 

The top rectangle in the license plate is color-coded according to the type of vehicle being licensed.

Private vehicles: Light Blue

Taxis: Orange

Trucks: Red

Buses: Gray

Limousines and tourist buses: Beige

Diplomatic Vehicles: Green, Instead of letters, there are numbers on the plate, ### - ##

Vehicles with unpaid customs: Yellow; foreign vehicles that cross into Egypt are required to carry this type of license plate during their stay in Egypt and pay the fees associated with it, as well as purchasing an Egyptian vehicle insurance and receiving a temporary Egyptian ownership title. In most common cases, such as tourists crossing from neighboring countries, the plate is valid for two weeks.

Police vehicles: Dark blue; additionally, the Arabic and English for "Police" replace "Egypt" in the upper bar. The writing at the top is white, as opposed to black.

''Motorcycles: Light Blue, same as private vehicles, the registration code is shown in two lines

Older versions 
Before the introduction of the new alphanumeric plate system in August 2008, Egyptian vehicle registration numbers were purely numeric, and registered by governorate and registration type. Privately owned vehicles were generally given white plates with black lettering; other vehicles' plates were color-coded, with the entire plate being in the applicable color, as follows:

Taxis: Orange
Trucks: Red
Government-owned vehicles, including police: Blue, sometimes with a white bar
Public buses: Gray
Vehicles with unpaid customs: Yellow

Some of these older plates are still in use, but it is the government's intention to replace all the plates with the new color-coded plates within 1 to 2 years.

External links
 Egyptian license plates Pictures and detailed information

Car number plate
Egypt
Egypt communications-related lists
 Registration plates